Emerson W. Pugh (born May 1, 1929) is an American research engineer and scientist, whose career at US corporation IBM spanned several decades and resulted in significant technological advances. He was a leader in magnetic and computer memory technologies and author of several books, including college-level physics textbooks and the history of IBM. He is a fellow of the American Physical Society and the American Association for the Advancement of Science. He was President of IEEE in 1989.

Biography
Pugh was born in Pasadena, California. His family moved to Pittsburgh, Pennsylvania, where he was raised. After public-school education, he received BS and PhD degrees at Carnegie Tech. Following his graduation, he taught at Carnegie Tech for one year. He then began working at IBM in 1957.

Career at IBM
Pugh began working at the IBM research facility in 1957. After several months he was named manager of the Metals Physics Group. The group's research led to the development of the thin magnetic film array used in the IBM System/360. They also developed computer-memory techniques including magnetic bubble memory, and began development of a word processor for the Japanese language.

Pugh produced four books on IBM history and development of its products. He retired from IBM in 1993.

Activity with IEEE
While still working at IBM, Pugh was active in the Institute of Electrical and Electronics Engineers. His first presentation was in 1964, and in 1965 he became a senior member of IEEE. He was named editor of IEEE Transactions on Magnetics in 1968. He was president of the Magnetics Society (1973–74), then Division Director, Executive Vice President, and VP of Technical Activities. In 1989 he was elected President of IEEE. He was also active on the IEEE History Committee, and was one of the trustees of the History Center. He served as President of the IEEE Foundation (2000–04).

While serving on the IEEE History Committee (2009), Pugh created the STARS program with the IEEE History Center.

Partial bibliography
 Principles of Electricity and Magnetism
 Building IBM 
 IBM's 360 and Early 370 Systems

References

1929 births
Living people
American computer scientists
IBM employees
Fellow Members of the IEEE
Fellows of the American Physical Society
Fellows of the American Association for the Advancement of Science
Carnegie Mellon University alumni